Hard Freeze is a 2002 novel by American writer Dan Simmons. It is the second of three hardboiled detective novels featuring the character of Joe Kurtz.

2002 American novels